Braulio Brizuela Benítez (born 24 August 1988) is a Paraguayan naturalized Chilean former footballer who played in Chile and Ecuador.

Club career
As a child, Brizuela was with the Colo-Colo youth ranks, then he switched to Universidad Católica football academy, where he started his career, before moving (on loan) to Provincial Osorno in 2007. There, he had a well season, helping the team to won the Primera B title, and thereby the promotion to 2008 Primera División de Chile season. He was a key player scoring thirteen goals in thirty two matches.

In January 2009, Brizuela joined Ecuadorian Serie B side Club Deportivo Universidad Católica del Ecuador on loan. One more time, he was a key player in a promotion tournament, scoring now 11 goals. The incoming year he again was sent on loan, but now returning to Chile to join Curicó Unido. He played two seasons there, but with an unsuccessful performance.

On 24 January 2013, he joined Deportes Puerto Montt on loan.

Return to Universidad Católica
In mid-2013, he returned to Universidad Católica.

On 29 September 2013, he made his league debut for Católica in a 2–2 away draw with Deportes Iquique at Estadio Tierra de Campeones for Torneo Apertura's ninth week.

On 13 December 2013, he was sent-on in the 69' minute, again in a match with Deportes Iquique (in a new 2–2 draw at Tierra de Campeones) for the League's qualification playoffs to the 2014 Copa Libertadores. He didn't appear in the next game where Católica was eliminated by Iquique in the shootout following draw 1–1 at San Carlos de Apoquindo.

San Marcos de Arica
In early 2014, he was sent on loan to San Marcos de Arica. On 5 January, he debuted for Arica as a starter in a 1–0 home win over Magallanes: the centre back Luis Alegría on 33rd minute. However, in that match Brizuela only played 28 minutes being replaced by playmaker Renato González. Around the Torneo Clausura Primera B, he only played six games and didn't scored goals. On 15 May, the team achieved its promotion.

Lota Schwager
On 8 August 2014, it was reported that Brizuela was loaned to Lota Schwager.

Retirement
His last clubs were San Marcos de Arica and Lota Schwager. After not joining any club, he officially retired in 2016.

Personal life
He is the younger brother of Paraguayan international Hugo Brizuela.

He acquired the Chilean nationality by residence.

After his retirement, he went to Europe alongside Mauricio Isla, staying in France and Italy for a few years.

Honors

Club
Provincial Osorno
 Primera B de Chile (1): 2007

San Marcos de Arica
 Primera B de Chile (1): 2014 Clausura

References

External links

1988 births
Living people
Sportspeople from Asunción
Paraguayan footballers
Paraguayan emigrants to Chile
Naturalized citizens of Chile
Chilean footballers
Club Deportivo Universidad Católica footballers
Provincial Osorno footballers
Santiago Wanderers footballers
C.D. Universidad Católica del Ecuador footballers
Curicó Unido footballers
Puerto Montt footballers
San Marcos de Arica footballers
Lota Schwager footballers
Chilean Primera División players
Primera B de Chile players
Ecuadorian Serie B players
Segunda División Profesional de Chile players
Paraguayan expatriate sportspeople in Chile
Paraguayan expatriate sportspeople in Ecuador
Chilean expatriate sportspeople in Ecuador
Expatriate footballers in Chile
Expatriate footballers in Ecuador
Association football forwards